Ramón Armando Rodriguez Lugo (7 September 1895, in Cúa, Miranda – 16 April 1959, in Caracas) was a Venezuelan writer, journalist, and historian, best remembered as the author of the 1957 Diccionario biográfico, geográfico e histórico de Venezuela.

The son of Ramón Rodriguez Delgado Diaz and Rosa Lugo, he began publishing short stories and articles in the journal América de Puerto Cabello in 1920. That same year he published one of his best known poems, titled "Chrysalis". Ramón Rodríguez collaborated with magazines such as Élite (1925), La Esfera
and El Heraldo. He worked in large companies such the Royal Bank of Canada (1925-1936), the Industrial Bank of Venezuela (1938-1945) and BAP (1946-1954). 
In 1942 he was involved in the foundation of the Colegio Nacional de Técnicos en Contabilidad (National Association of Accounting Technicians), and was appointed its president in 1947.

Over 20 years, Ramón Rodriguez wrote a major work, an encyclopedia entitled Diccionario biográfico, geográfico e histórico de Venezuela, a work that seeks to reflect the biographical, historical and geographical knowledge of Venezuela. It was first published in Madrid, in 1957.

References

Bibliography

1895 births
1959 deaths
Venezuelan male writers
Venezuelan journalists
Encyclopedists
People from Cúa
20th-century Venezuelan historians
20th-century male writers
20th-century journalists